Gongbei may refer to:

 Gongbei Port of Entry in Zhuhai, Guangdong, on the Mainland China's border with Macau
 Gongbei Subdistrict, an administrative subdistrict (jiedao) in Zhuhai City, Guangdong
 Gongbei (Islamic architecture), grave of a Sufi master in Northwestern China